The American Experiment: A History of the United States, written by Steven M. Gillon and Cathy D. Matson, is an advanced American high school history textbook often used for AP United States History courses, and a university undergraduate level textbook.  The book, first published in 2002, is in its third edition.

References

External links

editions and formats at WorldCat.
search results at Worldcat.

History textbooks
History books about the United States